DeQuincy High School is a senior high school in DeQuincy, Louisiana, United States. It is a part of Calcasieu Parish Public Schools.

History
A man named Mr. D. D. Hereford began teaching in DeQuincy in 1899. In 1910 a dedicated brick school building opened for 148 students. The Louisiana State Department of Education declared it an approved high school in 1913. The following year it moved into a new brick building and had an enrollment of about 700. A storm destroyed two of the school's buildings in 1918, and the school moved into rebuilt facilities. The Southern Association of Colleges and Secondary Schools began accrediting the school in 1920. One school building was destroyed by a fire in 1943. The high school moved to its present site in 1959–60. The school building that replaced the one destroyed by the first fire was destroyed by a 1970 fire that also damaged the gymnasium.

Athletics
DeQuincy High athletics competes in the LHSAA.

Football
DeQuincy football was Class 1A state runners-up in 1949.

Notable alumni
 Scott Brown (baseball) (1974), professional baseball player for the Cincinnati Reds.

References

External links
 DeQuincy High School

Schools in Calcasieu Parish, Louisiana
Public high schools in Louisiana